The 1976 United States presidential election in Idaho took place on November 2, 1976, as part of the 1976 United States presidential election. State voters chose four representatives, or electors, to the Electoral College, who voted for president and vice president.

Idaho was won by incumbent President Gerald Ford (R–Michigan), with 59.9 percent of the popular vote, against Jimmy Carter (D–Georgia), with 37.1 percent of the popular vote. Two third party candidates accumulated a portion of the vote greater than one percent: Lester Maddox (AIA–Georgia) and Roger MacBride (L–Vermont). Despite losing in Idaho, Carter went on to win the national election and became the 39th president of the United States. Idaho had previously voted Republican ten times, Democrat ten times, and Populist once.

With 59.88 percent of the popular vote, Idaho would prove to be Ford's second strongest state in the 1976 election after neighboring Utah.

Results

Results by county

See also
 United States presidential elections in Idaho

References

Idaho
1976
1976 Idaho elections